Events in the year 2022 in Vietnam.

Incumbents

Events 
 Ongoing: COVID-19 pandemic in Vietnam
 20 January – The country reports its first three locally transmitted cases of the SARS-CoV-2 Omicron variant in Ho Chi Minh City.
 15 February – Vietnam lifts its COVID-19-related curbs on international passenger flights with no limitation on the number of flights in order to restore the travel to pre-pandemic level.
 6 September – A karaoke bar fire near Ho Chi Minh City kills at least 32 people.

Deaths 

 9 January – Nguyễn Côn, politician, deputy prime minister (b. 1916).
 22 January – Thích Nhất Hạnh, Zen Buddhist monk (b. 1926).
 25 March – Nguyễn Hữu Việt, Olympic swimmer (b. 1988)
 4 May – Nguyễn Duy Quý, academic and politician (b. 1932)
 6 July – Tricia, Vietnamese-born Australian Asian elephant (b. 1957)
 23 July – Nguyễn Xuân Vinh, aerospace engineer and military officer (b. 1930)
 29 August – Paul-Marie Cao Ðình Thuyên, Roman Catholic prelate (b. 1927)
 6 September – Thẩm Thúy Hằng, actress (b. 1939)
 12 October – Ngo Vinh Long, Vietnamese-American historian (b. 1944)
 9 November – Lê Lựu, writer (b. 1942)

References 

 

 
Vietnam
Vietnam
2020s in Vietnam
Years of the 21st century in Vietnam